Rigmor Brøste (born 1965) is a Norwegian politician and civil servant.  She is serving as the acting County Governor of Møre og Romsdal county from 2019 up to when Else-May Botten will take over as the official governor of the county.

Brøste received her cand.mag. degree from the University of Oslo.  She worked in municipal government from 1999 to 2006 for Molde Municipality and from 2006 to 2012 for Nesset Municipality.  Since 2012, she has worked as an assistant county governor for Møre og Romsdal county.  In 2018, the Governor Lodve Solholm retired and the government of Norway appointed Else-May Botten as the new governor, but since she is currently serving in the Parliament of Norway, she cannot take office as the next governor until 2021 when she leaves the Parliament.  The government then appointed Brøste as the acting governor to act until Botten can take office.

References

1965 births
Living people
University of Oslo alumni
County governors of Norway